The 2008 XL Bermuda Open was an ATP Challenger Series tournament. It took place in Paget, Bermuda, from April 21 to April 27, 2008.

External links
Official website

2008 ATP Challenger Series
Tennis in Bermuda